Barsine euprepia is a species of moth of the family Erebidae, subfamily Arctiinae. It is found endemic to Borneo. It is an uncommon species occurring over a wide altitude range from the lowlands (including dry heath forest at Telisai in Brunei) to 1,660 meters.

External links
The Moths of Borneo

Nudariina
Moths of Borneo
Moths described in 1900